The Blue Diamond Preview (Fillies) is a Melbourne Racing Club Group 3  Thoroughbred horse race, raced under set weights with penalties conditions for two-year-old fillies, over a distance of 1000 metres run at Caulfield Racecourse in Melbourne, Australia in late January. Prize money for the race is A$200,000.

History
The race is considered a lead-up to the Group 3 Blue Diamond Prelude Fillies the following month and both races are used as lead-up races to the Group 1 Blue Diamond Stakes in late February at Caulfield. The race is usually held on the Australia Day public holiday. Along with this event the Listed race Blue Diamond Preview for colts and geldings is held on the same day.

Fillies that have captured the Blue Diamond Preview – Blue Diamond Stakes double: 
Bounding Away (1986)  and Miracles Of Life (2013)

Name
Prior to 1996, the race was known as Blue Diamond Prelude (Filly) and was run at Sandown Racecourse, but was not to be confused with the Blue Diamond Prelude Fillies run at Caulfield Racecourse a couple of weeks later at a distance of 1,100 metres.

Grade
1982–1987 - Listed race
 1988–2005 - Group 3
 2006–2014 - Listed race
 2015 onwards  - Group 3

Distance
 1982–1983 – 1200 metres
 1984 onwards - 1000 metres

Venue
 1988–1996 - Sandown Racecourse
 1997–2005 -  Caulfield Racecourse
 2006 - Sandown Racecourse
 2007–2014 -  Caulfield Racecourse
 2015 - Sandown Racecourse
 2016 onwards - Caulfield Racecourse

Winners

 2023 - De Sonic Boom
 2022 - Miss Roseiano 
 2021 - Dosh
2020 - A Beautiful Night 
2019 - Catch Me 
2018 - Lady Horseowner
2017 - Limestone
2016 - Sword Of Light
2015 - Fontiton
2014 - Eloping
2013 - Miracles Of Life
2012 - Malasun 
2011 - One Last Dance 
2010 - Crystal Lily
2009 - Rostova
2008 - Siennas Fury
2007 - Beauty School
2006 - Jumlah
2005 - †Void Race
2004 - World Peace
2003 - Halibery
2002 - Bardego Barathea
2001 - Ashkaleta
2000 - Ponton Flyer
1999 - Northeast Sheila
1998 - Compulsion
1997 - Scandinavia
1996 - Our Cashel
1995 - Danaides
1994 - Tennessee Morn
1993 - Rosas Image
1992 - Castle Pines
1991 - Irises
1990 - Triscay
1989 - Confederate Lady
1988 - Scarlet Bisque
1987 - Midnight Fever
1986 - Bounding Away
1983 - Worth
1982 - Olive Branch

† The race was declared a "No Race" after stewards deemed two runners had gained a "flying start" after bursting through the stalls moments before the gates opened.

See also
 List of Australian Group races
 Group races

References

Horse races in Australia
Caulfield Racecourse
Flat horse races for two-year-olds